Tumanako "Tui" Teka (8 March 193723 January 1985), better known by his stage names Tui Latui or Prince Tui Teka was a Māori singer and actor. Teka was a member of the Maori Volcanics Showband before having a successful solo career.

Career
Teka was born in Ruatahuna, New Zealand near Te Urewera. His parents were both musicians, and he learnt to play the guitar and saxophone at a young age. He moved to Sydney in the early 1950s. In 1959, Teka, Jonny Nicol, and Mat Tenana joined the Royal Samoans and Maoris. The band was later renamed Prince Tui Latui & The Maori Troubadours. In 1968 he joined Maori Volcanics Showband, touring the Pacific for six years. In 1972 he began his solo career, and returned home releasing two albums: Real Love and Oh Mum, as well as the Māori love song "E Ipo". In 1974 he met with Noel Tio; both Tui and Noel had known each other since 1958, so Noel Tio Enterprises Pty Ltd. became his Australian (only) manager for 11 years. Before his death in 1985, he was in the West German TV series Jack Holborn and starred in New Zealand films Came a Hot Friday and Savage Islands.

Teka died in early 1985 of a heart attack in his room while waiting to perform at the Ruawai Tavern in Northland, and was survived by his wife Missy and daughters Davinia and Missy Jr. Missy died in 2008 as a result of a motor vehicle accident.

References

External links
Prince Tui Teka at AudioCulture
 Prince Tui Teka at NZ On Screen
 
 Prince Tui Teka's band arrangements at the Alexander Turnbull Library

1937 births
1985 deaths
APRA Award winners
New Zealand male film actors
New Zealand Māori musicians
New Zealand male Māori actors
Ngāi Tūhoe people
New Zealand Māori male singers
People from Ruatahuna
20th-century New Zealand male actors
20th-century New Zealand male singers
Māori-language singers